The 1989 Dayton Flyers football team was an American football team that represented the University of Dayton as an independent during the 1989 NCAA Division III football season. In their ninth season under head coach Mike Kelly, the Flyers compiled a 13–0–1 record and won the NCAA Division III national championship.

Schedule

References

Dayton
Dayton Flyers football seasons
NCAA Division III Football Champions
College football undefeated seasons
Dayton Flyers football